The Orh (also known as Oad, Odh, Orh Rajput or Orad Rajput) is a drifting tribe of laborers in Gujarat, Kathiawar, and some parts of Rajasthan. They drift and shift lock, stock, and barrel with their families wherever work is to be done. They are said to hold a variety of occupations. As artisans, they are carpenters, masons and stoneworkers and were considered to be Dalits. As traders, they deal in grain, spices, perfumes, and cloth. They are spread across 40 villages in Uttarakhand and Uttar Pradesh where they bear surnames like Gadahi, Bhagat, Galgat, Kahlia, Kudavali, Maangal, Majoka, Mundai, Sarvana, and Virpali.

References 

Social groups of Uttar Pradesh
Social groups of Uttarakhand
Social groups of Odisha